{
  "type": "ExternalData",
  "service": "page",
  "title": "ROCEEH/Chatelperronian.map"
}

The Châtelperronian is a proposed industry of the Upper Palaeolithic, the existence of which is debated. It represents both the only Upper Palaeolithic industry made by Neanderthals and the earliest Upper Palaeolithic industry in central and southwestern France, as well as in northern Spain. It derives its name from Châtelperron, the French village closest to the type site, the cave La Grotte des Fées).

It is preceded by the Mousterian industry, and lasted from c. 45,000 to c. 40,000 BP. The industry produced denticulate stone tools, and a distinctive flint knife with a single cutting edge and a blunt, curved back. The use of ivory at Châtelperronian sites appears to be more frequent than that of the later Aurignacian, while antler tools have not been found. It is followed by the Aurignacian industry.

Scholars who question its existence claim that it is an archaeological mix of Mousterian and Aurignacian layers. The Châtelperronian industry may relate to the origins of the very similar Gravettian culture. French archaeologists have traditionally classified both cultures together under the name Périgordian, Early Perigordian being equivalent to the Châtelperronian and all the other phases corresponding to the Gravettian, though this scheme is not often used by Anglophone authors.

Important sites and lithic production and associations

Large thick flakes/small blocks were used for cores, and were prepared with a crest over a long smooth surface. Using one or two striking points, long thin blades were detached. Direct percussion with a soft hammer was likely used for accuracy. Thicker blades made in this process were often converted into side scrapers, burins were often created in the same manner from debitage as well.

The manner of production is a solid continuation of the Mousterian but the ivory adornments found in association are similar to those made by the Aurignacian. The technological refinement of the Châtelperronian and neighbouring Uluzzian in Central-Southern Italy is often argued to be the product of cultural influence from H. sapiens that lived nearby.

Dispute over disruption of the site
João Zilhão and colleagues argue that the findings are complicated by disturbance of the site in the 19th century, and conclude that the apparent pattern of Aurignacian/Châtelperronian inter-stratification is an artifact of disturbance. while others think the Châtelperronian itself is an artifact of disturbance. Paul Mellars and colleagues have criticized the analysis of Zilhão et al., and argue that the original excavation by Delporte was not affected by disturbance. 
Paul Mellars, however, now has concluded on the basis of new radiocarbon dating by Thomas Higham of the decorative artifacts of Grotte du Renne "that there was [a] strong possibility—if not probability—
that [decorative artefacts] were stratigraphically intrusive into the Châtelperronian deposits from .. overlying Proto-Aurignacian levels" and that "The central and inescapable implication of the new dating results from the Grotte du Renne is that the single most impressive and hitherto widely cited pillar of evidence for the presence of complex “symbolic” behavior among the late Neanderthal populations in Europe has now effectively collapsed." Subsequent research led by Jean-Jacques Hublin argues using new dates that the Châtelperronian tools were produced by Neanderthals. Unlike Higham's dates, which were taken directly from the decorative material, Hublin's were taken from associated bones. To Higham, dates taken directly from the decorative material are more convincing and should be given priority over those from associated material. To Hublin, Higham's dates were contaminated with varnish applied to the decorative material in the 1960s. Hublin's team subsequently used proteomic evidence to support their conclusion.

In popular culture

Author Jared Diamond argues in his 1991 non-fiction book, The Third Chimpanzee, that Châtelperron may represent a community of Neanderthals who to some extent had adopted the culture of the Early European modern humans that had established themselves in the surrounding area, which would account for the signs of the hybrid culture found at the site. Diamond compares these hypothetical Neanderthal holdouts to more recent Indigenous peoples of the Americas in North and South America who adopted European technologies such as firearms or domestication of horses in order to survive in an environment dominated by more technologically advanced competitors.

The fifth book of Jean Auel's Earth's Children series, The Shelters of Stone, 2002, and the sixth book The Land of the Painted Caves 2010 are set in this region of modern-day France, during this period.

Type site
The type site is la Grotte des Fées, in Châtelperron.

See also

Franco-Cantabrian region

References

External links

Picture Gallery of the Paleolithic (reconstructional palaeoethnology),  Libor Balák at Czech Academy of Sciences, Institute of Archaeology in Brno, Center for Paleolithic and Paleoethnological Research

Archaeological cultures of Western Europe
Upper Paleolithic cultures of Europe
Industries (archaeology)
Archaeological cultures in France